The 1897 A&M Aggies football team represented the Agricultural and Mechanical College of Texas—now known as Texas A&M University—as an independent during the 1897 college football season. Led by C. W. Taylor in his first and only season as head coach, the Aggies compiled a record of 1–2.

Schedule

References

Texas AandM
Texas A&M Aggies football seasons
Texas AandM Aggies football